Choudry Mohammad Sadiq (born 1900 in Batala, Gurdaspur district; died 1975). Sadiq graduated from Islamia College, Lahore and obtained his law degree in 1928. He became an eminent politician and remained a Muslim Leaguer before and after independence. He settled in Sindh in 1934. First bought land near Tando Ghulam Ali and then near Hyderabad and moved to Hyderabad in 1942. Founded Sindh Chamber of Agriculture in late 1960s. A famous housing scheme of Hyderabad (Sadiq Livina) is named after him.

1900 births
1975 deaths
Pakistani lawyers
Pakistani politicians
20th-century Pakistani lawyers